Juárez refers to a number of places and things, most of which are named after Benito Juárez, former President of Mexico.

Juárez or Juarez may refer to:

Places

Mexico
Ciudad Juárez, Chihuahua, a large city on the border with the United States
Juárez Municipality, Chihuahua
Colonia Juárez, Mexico City, a neighborhood or colonia
Juárez, Nuevo León, a city
Juárez, Chiapas, a small city and municipality
Juárez Municipality, Coahuila, a small town and municipality
Juárez, Hidalgo, a small town and municipality
Juárez Municipality, Michoacán, a municipality
Sierra de Juárez, a mountain range in the state of Baja California
Sierra Juárez, Oaxaca, a mountain range in the state of Oaxaca

United States
Juarez, Texas, a census-designated place

Arts and entertainment
Juarez (film), a 1939 movie starring Paul Muni as Benito Juárez
Juarez (album), a 1975 album by Terry Allen
"Juarez" (song), from the 2014 album Hesitant Alien by Gerard Way
"Juarez", from the 1999 album To Venus and Back by Tori Amos

Transportation
Avenida Juárez, a street in the historic center of Mexico City
Ciudad Juárez International Airport in Ciudad Juarez, Chihuahua, Mexico
Juárez–Lincoln International Bridge, linking Laredo, Texas with Nuevo Laredo, Tamaulipas

People
Juárez (surname)
Juárez (footballer), Brazilian former footballer Juárez de Souza Teixeira (born 1973)
Juarez Machado (born 1941), Brazilian painter
Juarez Moreira (born 1954), Brazilian guitarist and composer
Rocky Juarez (born 1980) Mexican-American professional boxer

Other uses
FC Juárez, a football club based in Ciudad Juárez, Mexico
Juárez Cartel
Universidad Juárez Autónoma de Tabasco, the state university of Tabasco, Mexico

See also
Juárez station (disambiguation)